"Sister Ray" is a song by the Velvet Underground that closes side two of their 1968 album White Light/White Heat. The lyrics are by Lou Reed, with music composed by John Cale, Sterling Morrison, Maureen Tucker and Reed.

The song concerns drug use, violence, homosexuality, and transvestism. Reed said of the lyrics: "'Sister Ray' was done as a joke—no, not as a joke, but it has eight characters in it and this guy gets killed and nobody does anything. It was built around this story that I wrote about this scene of total debauchery and decay. I like to think of 'Sister Ray' as a transvestite smack dealer. The situation is a bunch of drag queens taking some sailors home with them, shooting up on smack and having this orgy when the police appear."

At 17 minutes 29 seconds, it is the longest song on White Light/White Heat, taking up most of the second side of the record, as well as the longest song in the Velvet Underground's studio discography.

Rock critic Lester Bangs wrote in 1970, "The early Velvets had the good sense to realize that whatever your capabilities, music with a simple base structure was the best. Thus, 'Sister Ray' evolved from a most basic funk riff seventeen minutes into stark sound structures of incredible complexity."

Studio version

Recording
"Sister Ray" was recorded in one take. The band agreed to accept whatever faults occurred during recording, resulting in over 17 minutes of improvised material. The song was recorded with Reed providing lead vocals and guitar, Morrison on guitar, and Tucker on drums, while Cale plays an organ routed through a distorted guitar amplifier. Morrison remarked that he was amazed at the volume of Cale's organ during the recording and that he had switched the guitar pickup on his Fender Stratocaster from the bridge position to the neck position to get "more oomph". It is also notable that the song features no bass guitar because Cale, who usually played bass or viola, played organ on the take. The band had a sponsorship from Vox amplifiers, which allowed use of top-of-the-line amps and distortion pedals to create a distorted, noisy sound.

After the opening sequence, which is a modally flavored I-VII-IV G-F-C chord progression, much of the song is led by Cale and Reed exchanging percussive chords and noise for over ten minutes, similar to avant-jazz. Reed recalled that recording engineer Gary Kellgren walked out while recording the song: "The engineer said, 'I don't have to listen to this. I'll put it in Record, and then I'm leaving. When you're done, come get me.'"

Reed called the song "Sister Ray" in a nod to Ray Davies of the British band the Kinks.

Personnel
 Lou Reed – lead vocals, electric guitar
 John Cale – Vox Continental organ
 Sterling Morrison – Fender Stratocaster electric guitar
 Maureen Tucker – drums

Live versions
"Sister Ray" was a concert favorite of the band, who regularly closed their set with the song. The studio recording of the song was recorded in one single take that lasts over 17 minutes, while live versions were known to last as much as half an hour or more. The triple live album Bootleg Series Volume 1: The Quine Tapes, released in 2001, features three live performances of  "Sister Ray" from 1969, with approximate running times of 24, 38 and 29 minutes. The band also had an intro entitled "Sweet Sister Ray" that they would perform occasionally. On the single known recording of this intro (recorded during the April 30, 1968, show, and without the complete subsequent performance of "Sister Ray"), "Sweet Sister Ray" alone lasts for over 38 minutes.

Cover versions
Jonathan Richman plays a portion of "Sister Ray" on his song "Velvet Underground." Indeed, it has been argued that Richman's "Roadrunner" is, considering its distorted organ solo (provided by producer John Cale) and chordal similarities, largely a reworking of "Sister Ray" in musical terms, although Richman's lyrics about the joys of driving around suburban Boston are in marked contrast to Reed's detached saga of "debauchery and decay".
Joy Division played a shortened version of the song at the Moonlight Club in London on April 2, 1980. A recording of this album is available on their rarities album Still and has been regarded by some as a uniquely darker take on the song.

References

The Velvet Underground songs
1968 songs
Songs written by Lou Reed
Songs about drugs
Songs about heroin
American garage rock songs
American psychedelic rock songs
LGBT-related songs
Song recordings produced by Tom Wilson (record producer)
Songs written by John Cale
Noise rock songs